The Batesville White Sox, based in Batesville, Arkansas played in the Northeast Arkansas League in 1936 and 1938.

External links
Baseball Reference Batesville

Baseball teams established in 1936
Baseball teams disestablished in 1938
Professional baseball teams in Arkansas
Defunct Northeast Arkansas League teams
St. Louis Browns minor league affiliates
1936 establishments in Arkansas
1938 disestablishments in Arkansas
Batesville, Arkansas
Defunct baseball teams in Arkansas
Northeast Arkansas League teams